Mikołaj Rudnicki - (born 6 December 1881 in Sokołów Podlaski - died 28 June 1978 in Puszczykowo) was a Polish linguist. He finished his studies in Kraków. In 1911 he became a docent in Indoeuropean linguistics.

In 1919 he became a professor at Uniwersytet Poznański. From 1945 he was a member of the Polish Academy of Learning.

He published many works on psycho-phonetic issues:

 Studia psychofonetyczne
 Przyczynki do gramatyki i słownika narzecza słowiańskiego (1913)
 Wykształcenie językowe w życiu i w szkole (1920)
 Z dziejów polskiej myśli językowej i wychowania (1921)
 Prawo identyfikacji wyobrażeń niedostatecznie różnych (1927)
 Językoznawstwo polskie w dobie Oświecenia (1956)
 Prasłowiańszczyzna
 Lechia Polska (1959–1961)

He also published many literature works and dramas using the pen names: M.S. Rozwar and E. Meser.

Mikołaj Rudnicki proved that the ancestry of name Schivelbein comes from Skwielbin or Skwilbin, which means disc on swamp.

Sources 

Wielka Encyklopedia Powszechna PWN (1962–1969)

Koerner, E. F. K.  and A. J. Szwedek (eds)(2001)Towards a history of linguistics in Poland: from the early beginnings to the end of the twentieth century, Benjamins, John Publishing Company - Part II: Portraits of Major Polish Linguists. Chapter 8 Mikołaj Rudnicki’s General Linguistic Conceptions by Jerzy Bańczerowski.

External links 
 http://univ.gda.pl/~filklin/artCyb2.htm

References 

1881 births
1978 deaths
Linguists from Poland
20th-century linguists